The Amphicar Model 770 is an amphibious automobile which was launched at the 1961 New York Auto Show. It was made in West Germany and marketed from 1961 to 1968, with production ceasing in 1965.

Designed by Hans Trippel, the amphibious vehicle was manufactured by the Quandt Group at Lübeck and at Berlin-Borsigwalde, with a total of 3,878 manufactured in a single generation. The name Amphicar is a portmanteau of "amphibious" and "car."

A descendant of the Volkswagen Schwimmwagen, the Amphicar offered only modest performance compared to most contemporary boats or cars, featured navigation lights and flag as mandated by the US Coast Guard — and after operation in water, required greasing at 13 points, one of which required removal of the rear seat.

In 2014, the publication Petrolicious described the Amphicar as "good for one thing: fun. It’s not quick or flashy, but it’s iconic, unique and friendly. What more could you ask from a vintage car? ... The Amphicar might not make any sense and that’s precisely why it’s so wonderful."

Product description (1966 Amphicar Model 770)
Engine: Triumph four-cylinder engine of 1147 cc, 8:1 compression ratio, rated at 43 bhp

Chassis/body

Appearance

Front undersurface is slightly pointed and sharply cut away below.  The wheels are set low, so that the vehicle stands well above ground level when on dry land.  Front and rear bumpers are placed low on the body panels (but fairly high in relation to dry ground).  The one-piece windshield is curved.  The foldable top causes the body style to be classified as cabriolet.  Its water propulsion is provided by twin propellers mounted under the rear bumper. The Amphicar is made of mild steel.

Powertrain
The Amphicar's engine was mounted at the rear of the craft, driving the rear wheels through a 4-speed manual transmission. For use in the water, the same engine drove a pair of reversible propellers at the rear, with a second gear lever engaging forward or reverse drive. Once in the water, the main gear lever would normally be left in neutral. By engaging first gear as well as drive to the propellers when approaching a boat ramp, the Amphicar could drive itself out of the water.

Performance 
The powerplant was the 1147 cc (69 in³) Standard SC engine from the British Triumph Herald 1200. Many engines were tried in prototypes, but the Triumph engine was "state of the art" in 1961 and it had the necessary combination of performance, weight, cool running, and reliability. Updated versions of this engine remained in production in the Triumph Spitfire until 1980. The Amphicar engine had a power output of 43 hp (32 kW) at 4750 rpm, slightly more than the Triumph Herald due to a shorter exhaust. Designated the "Model 770", the Amphicar could achieve speeds of 7 knots in the water and 70 mph (110 km/h) on land.

Amphicar owners estimate they've been launching on the season's official opening day for the better part of a decade. On Saturday, three had arrived by 11 a.m. in Gas Works Park, but one more was expected for the noon departure from a nearby public ramp.
One owner said, "We like to think of it as the fastest car on the water and fastest boat on the road."

In water as well as on land, the Amphicar is steered with the front wheels, making it less maneuverable than a conventional boat.
Time’s In fact, during the recent floods in Britain, an Amphicar enthusiast served as a water taxi, bringing water and groceries to a group of stranded schoolkids. Bully!
In reality, a well maintained Amphicar does not leak at all and can be left in water, parked at a dock side, for many hours.

In popular culture 
In 1965, two Amphicars successfully navigated the Yukon River in Alaska.

Two Amphicars crossed the English Channel in Sept. 1965.

An Amphicar was restored in  season 11, episode seven of the television show Wheeler Dealers. The car was purchased in the United States for $35,000 and shipped to the UK. Its lower bodywork proved to be in poor condition and required complete soda blasting back to clean metal before welding of replacement panel sections. After a test drive in the Thames at Windsor, the restored vehicle was sold for £35,200 at a profit of £4,600 (at that time's exchange rate).

Amphicars appear in the films Rotten to the Core (1965), The Sandwich Man (1966), The President's Analyst (1967), Inspector Clouseau (1968), The Laughing Woman (1969), Savannah Smiles (1982), and Pontiac Moon (1994), and in episode five of season four of The Avengers ("Castle De'ath", 1965). It also appears in the TV movie All the Way (2016).

US President Lyndon B. Johnson owned an Amphicar. Johnson, a known practical joker, was said to enjoy frightening visitors at his Johnson City, Texas, ranch by driving them downhill in his Amphicar, directly into his property's lake, all the while shouting that he had malfunctioning brakes.

In a fifth-season episode of The Simpsons, an antique filmstrip touts Springfield's famous "aqua-car" factory, showing Amphicars rolling off an assembly line and into the water.

The Amphicar was featured in Visiting... with Huell Howser, episode 733.

History

Production started in late 1960. By the end of 1963, complete production was stopped. From 1963 to 1965 cars were assembled from shells and parts inventory built up in anticipation of sales of 25,000 units, with the last new build units assembled in 1965. Cars were titled in the year they actually sold rather than when they were produced, e.g. an unsold Amphicar assembled in 1963 or 1965 could be titled as 1967 or 1968 if that was when it was first sold.  Although the inventory could not be sold in the U.S. in the 1968 model year or later due to new environmental and USDOT emissions and safety equipment standards, they were available in other countries into 1968. The remaining inventory of unused parts was eventually purchased by Hugh Gordon of Santa Fe Springs, California.

Most Amphicars were sold in the United States. Cars were sold in the United Kingdom from 1964. Total production was 3,878 vehicles, of which only 97 were right-hand drive. Some were used in the Berlin police department and others were fitted for rescue operations.

Amphicar shows and rides
Amphicar owners regularly convene during the spring, summer, and fall at various locations nationwide for "swim-ins", the largest of which is held at Grand Lake St. Marys State Park, Ohio.

In 2015, the Boathouse at Walt Disney World's Disney Springs in Orlando, Florida, began offering public Amphicar rides to visitors, charging $125 per ride for groups of up to three.  Disney heavily re-engineered and enhanced the eight Amphicars of various original colors in its fleet for safety, reliability, and comfort.

See also
 DUKW
 Dutton Cars
 Gibbs Aquada (2004)
 Gibbs Humdinga (2006)
 Gibbs Quadski (2006)
 Schwimmwagen Type 166 (1942)
 Swamp buggy
 WaterCar

References

External links 

 Official website of the International Amphicar Owners Club
 400+ member Amphicar discussion forums with thousands of archived messages related to the Amphicar
 Amphicars.com a UK site with a lot of photographs and information on the "Wonderful World of Amphicars"
 Amphicar slideshow
 AmphicarVentures; has photos, videos, history, and a list of Amphicar friendly lakes and ramps
 Amphicar picnic: light-hearted video Mid-1960s video of an Amphicar in Jacksonville, Florida, in a short video with a local television personality.
 Amphicar  Video produced by Wisconsin Public Television

Vehicles introduced in 1961
Wheeled amphibious vehicles
Rear-engined vehicles